Dundee Football Club is a Scottish association football club based in the city of Dundee. The club first competed in a European competition in 1962–63, entering the European Cup as champions of Scotland. The club reached the semi-finals on its first attempt, which remains the club's best run in a UEFA competition.

Matches

Overall record

By competition

By country

Notes

References

Dundee F.C.
Dundee